The Yixun River is a subsidiary of Luan He, a river located in Hebei, a province of the People's Republic of China.

History
Until the name was changed to Luan He during the Ming Dynasty, the original name of Yixun He was Suo Tou shu(索頭水).

Rivers of Hebei